Martin Koukal (born 25 September 1978 in Nové Město na Moravě) is a Czech cross-country skier and mountaineer who has been competing since 1996. He won two medals at the FIS Nordic World Ski Championships with gold in 50 km (2003) and a bronze in the team sprint (2005). Koukal's best finish at the Winter Olympics was a seventh in the 50 km freestyle mass start in 2006. He also won eight other events in his career from 1998 to 2005 in distances up to 15 km. He has some mountaineering successes, like his Cho Oyu, Huascarán and Kangchenjunga expeditions. His younger brother, Petr, plays ice hockey for HC Pardubice in Czech Extraliga and in 2010 also became world champion of his own.

Cross-country skiing results
All results are sourced from the International Ski Federation (FIS).

Olympic Games
 1 medals – (1 bronze)

World Championships
 2 medals – (1 gold, 1 bronze)

World Cup

Season standings

Individual podiums
3 podiums – (2 , 1 )

Team podiums

1 victory – (1 )
4 podiums – (3 , 1 )

References

 

1978 births
Cross-country skiers at the 1998 Winter Olympics
Cross-country skiers at the 2002 Winter Olympics
Cross-country skiers at the 2006 Winter Olympics
Cross-country skiers at the 2010 Winter Olympics
Czech male cross-country skiers
Living people
Olympic cross-country skiers of the Czech Republic
Olympic bronze medalists for the Czech Republic
Olympic medalists in cross-country skiing
FIS Nordic World Ski Championships medalists in cross-country skiing
Medalists at the 2010 Winter Olympics
People from Nové Město na Moravě
Sportspeople from the Vysočina Region